Ellen von Meyern (died c. 1912) was a New Zealand artist who is remembered for her portraits of Maori people.

Life

Meyern was probably the daughter of Arthur von Meyern. Around 1895, she moved from Dunedin to Auckland, where she studied portraiture at the Elam School of Art. Her work includes portraits of her sister Blanche, with whom she shared a studio, and of music and theatre celebrities. Examples of her paintings can be seen in the National Museum of New Zealand. Von Meyern's Maori paintings are, like many by Gottfried Lindauer and Frances Hodgkins, associated with symbolist portraits of demure females with or without a child.

Her portrait of Prime Minister Richard Seddon is in the collection of the Auckland Art Gallery Toi o Tāmaki.

References

External links
Examples of works by Ellen von Meyern from the Australian Art Sales Digest

1912 deaths
19th-century New Zealand women artists
Artists from Dunedin
New Zealand women painters
New Zealand painters
Portrait artists
Elam Art School alumni